Nanshao Town is a town located in the eastern side of Changping District, Beijing, China. It shares border with Shisanling Town to its north, Cuicun Town to its east, Baishan and Shahe Towns to its south, Machikou Town to its southwest, Chengnan and Chengbei Subdistricts to its west. In 2020, the town had a total population of 65,403.

History

Administrative divisions 

By the end of 2021, Nanshao Town consisted of 26 subdivisions, including 10 communities, and 16 villages:

Gallery

See also 

 List of township-level divisions of Beijing

References 

Changping District
Towns in Beijing